I Love a Man in Uniform is a 1993 Canadian film, written and directed by David Wellington. It received a score of 60% on Rotten Tomatoes.

Plot
I Love a Man in Uniform is a dark psychological drama, starring Tom McCamus as Henry Adler, a bank employee and struggling actor who finally gets his big break when he is cast as a police officer in a television series. When Adler is finally cast in his role as Flanagan on the cop show Crimewave, Adler quits his job as a bank employee and immerses himself into his role. As Adler begins to commit further to his role as Flanagan, he begins to identify too closely with the sense of power and authority that comes with wearing the police uniform.

Adler takes to wearing the police uniform from the set in public, as if he were a real police officer, and gradually loses his grip on reality. He begins to roam the streets of Toronto, acting as though he is a police officer and interacting with citizens as if he is a police officer. This leads to Adler getting in trouble with his boss, who is not impressed that Adler is pretending he is a cop off set, however, this does not bother Adler. He blurs the line between fantasy and reality as he slips further into his fictional reality.

While on the set of Crimewave, Adler falls for one of the female actresses on the show, Charlie Warner, who is played by Brigitte Bako. They begin to rehearse their roles together offset, however, Charlie is quickly put off by Adler's quirks and his intensity and cuts Adler off. This sends Adler spiralling, causing him to become sporadic with his actions.

Cast
Tom McCamus as Henry Adler
Brigitte Bako as Charlie Warner
Kevin Tighe as Frank
Daniel MacIvor as Director
Henry Czerny as Joseph Riggs
Albert Schultz as Businessman
J. D. Nicholsen as Archer
Matthew Ferguson as Edward Nichols
Michael Hogan as Detective Itch
David Hemblen as Father

Awards
McCamus won the Genie Award as Best Actor for his performance. Tighe won the Genie Award for Best Supporting Actor.

Reception
I Love a Man in Uniform opened in 1993, and as of May 30, 2022, has a 60% rating on Rotten Tomatoes.

A review of the movie on Empireonline.com called the film "a hugely impressive and highly compelling first feature guaranteed to please anyone not put off by daft titles and obscure plots"

Year-end lists 
 Honorable mention – David Elliott, The San Diego Union-Tribune

References

External links
 

1993 films
English-language Canadian films
Canadian drama films
Films directed by David Wellington
1993 drama films
1990s English-language films
1990s Canadian films